Limnodynastes (commonly known as the Australian swamp frogs) is a genus of frog native to Australia, southern New Guinea and some Torres Strait Islands. They are ground-dwelling frogs, with no toe pads. The size varies from 45 mm to 90 mm in the giant banjo frog. The webbing on the feet ranges between species, from very little, to almost complete. The tympanum is not visible in any species, except in the woodworker frog, which is sometimes classed in a separate genus Megistolotis. All species construct a foam nest in which the eggs are laid. However, in south-eastern South Australia female striped marsh frog and spotted grass frog lack the flanges of skin on the hands that helps trap the air bubble and do not construct foam nests.

Species
Following a major revision of amphibians in 2006, two species, the ornate burrowing frog, Opisthodon ornatus and Spencer's burrowing frog, Opisthodon spenceri, were moved to the resurrected genus Opisthodon. This reduced the number of member species to eleven.

References

 
Amphibians of Australia
Amphibian genera
Taxa named by Leopold Fitzinger